1968 United States presidential election in Washington may refer to:

 1968 United States presidential election in Washington (state)
 1968 United States presidential election in Washington, D.C.